The 4th Central American and Caribbean Junior Championships was held in Nassau, Bahamas, on 22–25 August 1980.

Medal summary
Medal winners are published by category: Junior A, Male, Junior A, Female, and Junior B. 
Complete results can be found on the World Junior Athletics History website.

Male Junior A (under 20)

Female Junior A (under 20)

Male Junior B (under 17)

Female Junior B (under 17)

Medal table (unofficial)

Participation (unofficial)

A couple of smaller nations gave their debut at the championships, i.e. Antigua and Barbuda (to become independent by the end of that year), Bermuda, Guyana, and the Netherlands Antilles.
Detailed result lists can be found on the World Junior Athletics History website.    
There is no information on athletes competing in the relay teams.
An unofficial count yields the number of about 263 athletes (150 junior (under-20) and 113 youth (under-17)) from about 15 countries, resulting in a new record number of participating nations:

 (6)
 (58)
 (3)
 (15)
 (4)
 (1)
 (9)
 (2)
 (14)
 México (52)
 (4)
 Panamá (2)
 (46)
 (14)
 (33)

References

External links
Official CACAC Website
World Junior Athletics History

Central American and Caribbean Junior Championships in Athletics
Central American and Caribbean Junior Championships in Athletics
Central American and Caribbean Junior Championships in Athletics
International athletics competitions hosted by the Bahamas
1980 in youth sport